AD 45 (XLV) was a common year starting on Friday (link will display the full calendar) of the Julian calendar. At the time, it was known as the Year of the Consulship of Vinicius and Corvinus (or, less frequently, year 798 Ab urbe condita). The denomination AD 45 for this year has been used since the early medieval period, when the Anno Domini calendar era became the prevalent method in Europe for naming years.

Events

By place

Roman Empire 
 Salzburg (Juvavum) is awarded the status of a Roman municipium.
 Emperor Claudius expels the Jews from Rome.
 Claudius founds Savaria, today the Hungarian city of Szombathely.
 The Senate holds consultations regarding real estate speculation in Rome.

China 
 Chinese general Ma Yuan conducts an expedition against the Xiongnu and the Xianbei (in Manchuria).

By topic

Religion 
 Paul of Tarsus begins his missionary travels, according to one traditional dating scheme.
</onlyinclude>

Births 
 Ban Zhao, first female Chinese historian (d. 116)
 Domitilla the Younger, Roman noblewoman (d. AD 66)
 Lucius Julius Ursus Servianus, Roman politician (d. 136)
 Lucius Vipstanus Messalla, Roman orator (approximate date)
 Plutarch, Greek historian and biographer (approximate date)
 Publius Papinius Statius, Roman poet (approximate date)
 Tiberius Julius Celsus Polemaeanus, Roman politician

Deaths 
 Pomponius Mela, Roman geographer (approximate date)
 Vardanes I, king of the Parthian Empire (approximate date)

References 

0045

als:40er#45